Mitrofan Iosifovich Grodzitsky (1 October 1861, Minsk Governorate — after 1917) was a lawyer, a judge, a deputy of the Third and Forth Imperial Duma from Orenburg Governorate between 1907 and 1917. He was Commissioner for State Control, as well as Commissioner for the Chief Administration of Posts and Telegraphs of the Provisional Committee of the State Duma in 1917. He was participating in the preparation of the draft of Regulations on elections to the Russian Constituent Assembly. He was also a Central Committee member of the Russian Radical-Democratic Party.

Literature 
 Николаев А. Б. Гродзицкий Митрофан Иосифович (in Russian) // Государственная дума Российской империи: 1906—1917 / Б. Ю. Иванов, А. А. Комзолова, И. С. Ряховская. — Москва: РОССПЭН, 2008. — P. 150. — 735 p. — .
 Гродзинскій (in Russian) // Члены Государственной Думы (портреты и биографии). Третий созыв. 1907—1912 гг. / Сост. М. М. Боиович. — Москва, 1913. — P. 209. — 526 p.
 Сафонов Д. А. Гродзицкий, Митрофан Иосифович (in Russian) // Башкирская энциклопедия. — Уфа: ГАУН «Башкирская энциклопедия», 2013. — 

1861 births
Year of death missing
People from Minsk Governorate
Progressive Party (Russia) politicians
Members of the 3rd State Duma of the Russian Empire
Members of the 4th State Duma of the Russian Empire